Miles Müller (born 4 April 1995) is a German former professional footballer who played as a midfielder.

References

External links

 

Living people
1995 births
German footballers
Association football midfielders
Regionalliga players
2. Liga (Austria) players
FC Schalke 04 II players
Floridsdorfer AC players
German expatriate footballers
German expatriate sportspeople in Austria
Expatriate footballers in Austria
People from Dorsten
Sportspeople from Münster (region)
Footballers from North Rhine-Westphalia